Benedict Frempah (born 3 April 1995) is an Italian footballer who plays as a defender for National League South club Cheshunt.

Career
Ben began playing regularly at the age of 16 as a centre back for Fisher FC. Frempah played for non-league English club Cray Wanderers as a 17-year-old. He then moved seven levels up the English football league system when he signed for Leicester City. Frempah signed for Scottish Premiership club Ross County in July 2014. He made his professional debut on 13 August 2014, in a 4–0 defeat against Partick Thistle. Frempah was one of 14 players released by Ross County at the end of the 2014–15 season. He played briefly for Isthmian League club Hendon early in the 2015–16 season.

In December 2017, Frempah joined National League side Solihull Moors on a permanent deal. In March 2019, Wycombe Wanderers announced they had added Frempah to their squad on non-contract terms for the remainder of the season. After being released from Wycombe Wanderers at the end of the season, Frempah returned to non-league football and joined Wingate & Finchley.

He joined Ebbsfleet United in August 2020.

References

External links

1995 births
Living people
English footballers
Association football defenders
Fisher F.C. players
Cray Wanderers F.C. players
Leicester City F.C. players
Ross County F.C. players
Hendon F.C. players
Solihull Moors F.C. players
Guiseley A.F.C. players
Wycombe Wanderers F.C. players
Wingate & Finchley F.C. players
Ebbsfleet United F.C. players
Hayes & Yeading United F.C. players
Scottish Professional Football League players
Isthmian League players
English Football League players
National League (English football) players
Southern Football League players